was a Japanese kabuki actor of the Kamigata tradition; also known as Jinzaemon. His violent death at the hands of a starving writer living on the actor's property has been cited by scholars such as John Dower as an example of the chaos and "social disintegration" in the months and years immediately following Japan's defeat in World War II.

Names & Lineage
Like most kabuki actors, Nizaemon had a number of stage names over the course of his career. He debuted onstage under his birth name, Tōkichi Kataoka, and later took on the names Kataoka Tsuchinosuke II and Kataoka Gadō IV before becoming the twelfth in the line of Kataoka Nizaemon. He was the fourth actor to be known by the poetry name (haimyō) Roen, and bore the guild name (yagō) of Matsushimaya.

Nizaemon was born into a kabuki family, and was the son of Kataoka Nizaemon X, who in turn was the son of Kataoka Nizaemon VIII. His sons Kataoka Gadō V, Ichimura Yoshigorō II and Kataoka Roen VI followed him, and were active on stage for many years.

Life and career
Born into a kabuki family, the actor who would later be known as Nizaemon first took the stage in 1885, at the age of three, at the Chitose-za, under his birth name, Tōkichi Kataoka. His father, Kataoka Nizaemon X, died in 1895; young Tōkichi took on the name Tsuchinosuke the following year, becoming Kataoka Gadō IV several years later in 1901.

He frequently performed alongside Matsumoto Kōshirō VII and Ichimura Uzaemon XV, among others, and took part in many premiere and revival performances. He is said to have had a somewhat cold and gloomy acting style earlier in his career, when he frequently played alongside onnagata Onoe Baikō VI, though after Baikō's death, when Nizaemon came to more frequently act alongside Uzaemon XV, his style and apparent mood onstage brightened noticeably; this cold, gloomy personality would return, and served him well, however, as it suited perfectly the mood of certain sewamono roles and plays. Gadō played a young Minamoto no Yoshitsune (known as Ushiwakamaru in the play) in the 1912 debut of the dance drama Hashi Benkei, and would play Yoshitsune again on many occasions in Kanjinchō.

He took the name Nizaemon in a shūmei (name succession) ceremony in January 1936. He came to specialize in onnagata roles, i.e. female roles, and those of refined, graceful noblemen such as Yoshitsune is often portrayed. He played the courtesan Agemaki, the chief female role in Sukeroku Yukari no Edo Zakura in a March 1938 performance at the Osaka Kabuki-za.

His life and career were cut short, however, when, on 16 March 1946, he and four others in his household were murdered by Toshiaki Iida, in the actor's home. Iida was a writer who had been living in a detached house on the actor's property. Like the great majority of Japanese in the early post-war, Iida was extremely poor and starving. On this particular day, a quarrel erupted between Nizaemon and Iida who envied and resented the actor's relatively lavish lifestyle; it ended with the writer killing Nizaemon, his wife, his infant son, and two maids (included his sister) with a hatchet.

Iida was arrested in Miyagi Prefecture on 30 March. Feeble-mindedness was accepted in the trial and he was sentenced to life imprisonment on 22 October 1947.

References

Kabuki actors
1946 deaths
1882 births
Japanese murder victims
People from Tokyo
Male actors from Tokyo